Benjamin Spruill was a member of the Province of North Carolina House of Burgesses and  North Carolina General Assembly of 1779, representing Tyrrell County.

References 

18th-century American politicians
Members of the North Carolina General Assembly
Members of the North Carolina House of Burgesses